Toshihide Matsui and Vishnu Vardhan were the defending champions but only Matsui chose to defend his title, partnering Saketh Myneni. Matsui lost in the first round to Ivan Gakhov and Roman Safiullin.

Mikhail Elgin and Yaraslav Shyla won the title after defeating Arjun Kadhe and Denis Yevseyev 7–5, 7–6(8–6) in the final.

Seeds

Draw

References
 Main Draw

President's Cup - Men's Doubles
President's Cup (tennis)